Freddy Gray (born 10 January 1980), is a British journalist, deputy editor of The Spectator (a position to which he was appointed in 2014) and the primary editor of its US edition. Beginning his career at Mizz magazine, Gray later moved on to work at the Catholic Herald. Gray is the current host of the Spectators Americano podcast. Gray is the founding editor of the Spectators world edition and a former literary editor of The American Conservative. Gray spear-headed the introduction of a print edition of the Spectators US edition. Gray was a prominent ally of fellow journalist Toby Young during the controversy leading up to Young's resignation from his post at the Office for Students. Gray expressed a desire that the Spectators US edition not contain any strong bias concerning the presidency of Donald Trump and eschew any attempt to exert influence over the future of American conservatism. Gray has in the past described himself as a "free-speech enthusiast".

References

English journalists
1980 births
Living people
The Spectator people